Guillermo Vilas was the defending champion, but did not participate this year.

Manuel Orantes won the title, defeating Wojtek Fibak 6–3, 6–2, 6–4 in the final.

Seeds

  Manuel Orantes (champion)
  Wojtek Fibak (final)
  Balázs Taróczy (second round)
  Víctor Pecci, Sr. (second round)
  Tom Okker (second round)
  Ulrich Pinner (second round)
  Rolf Gehring (second round)
  Željko Franulović (second round)

Draw

Final

Section 1

Section 2

External links
 1979 Romika Cup Singles draw

Singles